Shackford Hall is a historic educational facility located at Lake Junaluska, Haywood County, North Carolina. It was built in 1923, and is a large two-story, Classic Revival style building constructed of river rock and heavy timber. It has a "T"-shaped plan with cross gable roof and features a massive pedimented portico with six two-story Ionic order columns. It stands as one of the iconic structures in the  Lake Junaluska Assembly.

It was listed on the National Register of Historic Places in 2001.

References

Properties of religious function on the National Register of Historic Places in North Carolina
Neoclassical architecture in North Carolina
Buildings and structures completed in 1923
Buildings and structures in Haywood County, North Carolina
National Register of Historic Places in Haywood County, North Carolina
Lake Junaluska, North Carolina